Anneli Lambing (since 1991 Parts; born 12 November 1968) is an Estonian badminton player.

She was born in Tartu.

She began her badminton career in 1979, coached by Mart Siliksaar. She is multiple-times Estonian champion. 1987–1990 she was a member of Estonian national badminton team.

References

Living people
1968 births
Estonian female badminton players
Sportspeople from Tartu
20th-century Estonian women